Godwin Hall is a building on the campus of James Madison University in Harrisonburg, Virginia, housing the School of Kinesiology, the School of Theatre and Dance, and the JMU Athletics department.  It is named after Virginia governor Mills E. Godwin, and his wife and JMU alumna Katherine Godwin.

The building is home to Sinclair Gymnasium, a 5,000 seat multi-purpose arena, named for Caroline Sinclair, who was the head of the physical education department at the time.  It was home to the James Madison Dukes basketball team until the James Madison University Convocation Center opened in 1982.  The building also houses Savage Natatorium, an Olympic-size swimming pool, with seats for 800 spectators.  The facility was named for Dorothy Savage, a former physical education instructor.

References

Further reading 
 

Indoor arenas in Virginia
Defunct college basketball venues in the United States
Sports venues in Virginia
Basketball venues in Virginia
James Madison Dukes basketball